The Pomorian Old Orthodox Church, also known as the Pomorian Church, Danilovtsy, Danilov's confession, or simply as Pomorians, is a branch of the priestless faction of the Old Believers, born of a schism within the Russian Orthodox Church at the end of the 17th century. They should not be confused with Pomors, which were people who inhabited the coast of the White Sea. Pomortsy was founded in Russian Karelia, by the Vyg River, by Danila Vikulin and the Denisov brothers. It became an official registered organization in 1909, after the "Freedom of Religion" manifesto was published on April 17, 1905, although it existed prior to that. The Pomorian Church saw several splits occur since its inception in 1694, including the Filippians and Fedoseyans who refused to pray for the Czar (моление за царя), and a major split during the 1800s, between Novopomortsy ("New Pomortsy"), who recognized marriage, and Staropomortsy ("Old Pomortsy"), who did not.

History 

The Pomorian soglasiye (Согласие, which means "creed" or "confession") is a group of bespopovtsy ("priestless") Old Believers, who abandoned the practice of receiving "runaway priests" after the death of the last pre-Raskol (schism) priests of the Russian Orthodox Church. In the absence of the priesthood, they began to elect literate laity to conduct services.

The Pomorian creed was formed in 1694, when the Vygovsky men's monastery (Vygovsky obschezhitelstvo) was founded in Pomorye by the Vyg river, which became the spiritual center for the entire creed from the early 17th to the middle 19th century as well as an ideological center for the priestless Old Believers. On the basis of the Solovetsky Monastery rules, the Pomorian service rules for the laity were created without words, which were given by priests.

In 1706, the Leksinskiy female monastery was founded. The Vygovsky monastery is famous for compiling its “Pomorian Answers,” which became the basis of its religious doctrine. In 1738, some Pomorians had started praying for the Tsar. This provoked a split in their community. Those that have not accepted praying for the Czar (моление за царя) during their services, formed the Filippovskiy (who also practiced self-immolation) and the Fedoseevtsy agreements. These subsequent groups also experienced additional divisions and splits later on.

Initially Pomortsy denied the sanctity of marriage. However, in the early 1830s, the Pomorian community became divided on the issue into Staropomortsy (Old-Pomorians), who continued to deny the sanctity of marriage, and the Novopomortsy (New-Pomorians), who allowed the transfer of property by inheritance and legalized marital relations outside the church marriage. The Novopomortsy also attracted members from other Old Believer groups who are disgruntled with the strict attitude towards marriage.

The official church registered with the government as a "church organization" after the "Freedom of Religion" manifesto publication on April 17, 1905. The first All-Russian Pomorian Council was held from May 1–10, 1909, in Moscow, the second in 1912. Local communities of Pomorians also became important economic centers of northern Russia in the early 19th century.

After the revolution of 1917, Pomorians outside of Russia have formed organizational centers in their countries of residence.

Organization 

The Pomorian Old Orthodox Churches are headed by National Councils and Spiritual Commissions in Russia, Lithuania, Latvia, Estonia, Poland, Belarus, and Ukraine. There are also Pomorian parishes in the United States, Brazil, and elsewhere. According to 2001 data, in Lithuania there are over 27,000 Old Believers in 59 officially registered parishes of the Pomorian Church.

 Council of the Pomorian Old-Orthodox Church in Russia (Russian: Российский Совет Древлеправославной Поморской Церкви)
Chairman - Vladimir Viktorovich Shamarin (since March 2018)
 Supreme Council of the Pomorian Old-Orthodox Churches in Vilnius, Lithuania (Russian: Высший Совет Древлеправославной Поморской Церкви Литвы)
Chairman - Grigory Boyarov (since February 2007)

 Central Council of the Pomorian Old-Orthodox Churches in Latvia (Russian: Центральный Совет Древлеправославной Поморской церкви Латвии)
acting Chairman - John Zhilko (since 2021)

 Union of Pomorian Old Believer Parishes in Estonia (Russian: Союз старообрядческих приходов Эстонии)
Chairman - Paul G. Varunin (since 1998)

 Supreme Council of the Pomorian Old Believers Churches in the Eastern Republic of Poland (Russian: Высший Совет Восточной Старообрядческой Церкви в Польской Республике)
Chairman - Mieczyslaw Terent'evich Kaplans (since July 2006)

 Central Council of the Pomorian Old-Orthodox Churches in the Republic of Belarus (Russian: Центральный Совет Древлеправославной Поморской Церкви в Республике Беларусь)
Chairman - Alexander Belov (since October 2010)

 Central Council of the Pomorian Old-Orthodox Churches in Ukraine (Russian: Центрального Совета Древлеправославная Поморская Церкови Украины)
Chairman - Nicola Venediktovich Babichev (since May 2003)

See also

 Pomors
 Filippians
 Fedoseevtsy
 Old Believers
 Russian Orthodox Church

References and notes

Further reading 
 Барановский В. С., Поташенко Г. Староверие Балтии и Польши: краткий исторический и биографический словарь. — Вильнюс: Aidai, 2005. — С. 141–153.
 
 Юхименко Е. М. Выговское старообрядческое общежительство: комплексный подход к изучению // Древняя Русь. Вопросы медиевистики. — 2002. — No. 2 (8). —С. 84–87.

External links
 Pomorian Old-Orthodox Church of Lithuania (Russian)
 Orthodox Wiki
 Information about the Pomorians (Russian)
 Pomorian Library (Russian)
 Old Believers in the Baltic States
 Pomorians in St. Petersburg, Russia (Russian)
 Additional History of Pomorians (Russian)

Old Believer movement
Eastern Orthodox organizations established in the 17th century
Christian denominations established in the 17th century